Cantat may refer to:
CANTAT, a submarine communications cable system
Europa Cantat
Universitas Cantat

People
Bertrand Cantat (born 1964), French musician
Isabelle Cantat (born 1974), French physicist
Serge Cantat (born 1973), French mathematician